The 2021–22 Aberdeen F.C. season is Aberdeen's 108th season in the top flight of Scottish football and the ninth in the Scottish Premiership. Aberdeen competed in the Scottish Cup, the League Cup and in qualifying for the inaugural season of 2021–22 UEFA Europa Conference League.

Summary

May
Player-coach Scott Brown arrived from Celtic in July. Scotland International defender Declan Gallagher signed a pre-contract from Motherwell. Striker Jay Emmanuel-Thomas signed from Livingston. Goalkeeper Gary Woods permanently joined from Oldham Athletic after his loan spell last season.

June
Young winger Teddy Jenks joined from Brighton and Hove Albion on a loan deal, Jack Gurr joined from manager Glass' former club Atlanta United on a free, and American International Christian Ramirez signed from Houston Dynamo for an undisclosed fee.

July
The club announced all pre-season fixtures were to be played behind closed doors but two matches were cancelled due to COVID-19. Scott Brown was announced as Team Captain with goalkeeper Joe Lewis becoming the Club Captain.

August
Aberdeen were knocked out of the League Cup by Championship side Raith Rovers. This followed with being knocked out of Europe by Azerbaijan side FK Qarabağ in the Play-off round.

September
Lewis Ferguson was called up and made his debut for the Scotland national team. The club however suffered a miserable September, losing all three matches in the Premiership. Niall McGinn and Lewis Ferguson were both called up for their respective countries for the October internationals.

October
Having lost five league games in a row, Glass was under pressure but was eased with wins against both Edinburgh clubs and were unlucky not to win at Ibrox.

November
On 20 November, the Dons lost to Dundee United, however off the pitch player Funso Ojo was assaulted by a United fan and was sent off for a second bookable offence. The fan was later charged and banned from football. Ojo himself also assaulted a separate United fan after the match. He was later charged for the incident

December
After three wins, the Dons lost at Easter Road to a Ryan Porteous goal, but during the match he was involved in an incident with Dons forward  Ramirez for which he was later given a three match ban. Young full back Jack MacKenzie signed a new contract. The year ended prematurely due to the Covid variant Omicron and the club were forced to play in front of 500 fans against Dundee on Boxing Day as the Dens Park side struggled to field a team.

January
Midfielder Matty Longstaff returned to his parent club after a disappointing spell with the club. Austin Samuels also returned to his parent club. Promising young American College player Dante Polvara signed a contract for the club. The club signed Dutch forward Vicente Besuijen on a four-and-a-half year contract.

February

After a poor run of results including a fifth-round defeat in the Scottish Cup to Motherwell, Stephen Glass left the club on 13 February. He was replaced by Barry Robson as interim manager. The club appointed Jim Goodwin as manager on 19 February Before the match with Dundee United, a statue was unveiled of their most successful manager to date, Sir Alex Ferguson.

March
It was announced that Team Captain and player-coach Scott Brown had left to pursue his coaching career elsewhere. For the second time during the season The Dons went 10 matches without a League win. Jim Goodwin's first win as manager came in a 3–1 home win against Hibernian on 19 March. The club descended to 10th place in the league.

April
It was revealed that long-serving defender and former Club Captain Andrew Considine would leave at the end of the season after rejecting the offer of a new deal on reduced terms. Michael Devlin and Jay Emmanuel-Thomas had their contracts terminated and left the club. A home defeat to Ross County consigned Aberdeen to a place in the bottom 6 of the league, failing to qualify for European competition for the first time since 2012-13. The team's first clean sheet in the league since December 2021 came in a 1–0 win against bottom placed Dundee.

May

Aberdeen secured their place in the Premiership with a draw at Hibernian. Gaining just 2 points from a possible 9 in the last month of the season, the club finished the league in 10th place. Andy Considine made his final appearance for The Dons at home to St Mirren in the season finale. Dylan McGeouch, Funso Ojo and Michael Ruth left the club on conclusion of their contracts, whilst Adam Montgomery and Teddy Jenks returned to their parent clubs at the end of their loan.

Results & fixtures

Pre-season

Scottish Premiership

Scottish League Cup 

Aberdeen enter the Second Round of the League Cup where they will play Raith Rovers. Stephen Glass made seven changes for the match and subsequently were knocked out.

Scottish Cup

UEFA Europa Conference League 

Aberdeen qualified by finishing in fourth place in the 2020–21 Scottish Premiership and entered in the second qualifying Round. They knocked out BK Hacken 5–3 on aggregate to enter the third qualifying Round against Breiðablik. They also knocked them out 5–3 on aggregate but lost the play-off round 4–1 on aggregate to Qarabağ.

Second qualifying round

Third qualifying round

Play-off round

Squad statistics

Appearances 

|-
|colspan="17"|Players who left the club during the season
|-
 

|}

Goalscorers 
As of 7 May 2022

Team statistics

League table

Results by round

Transfers

Players in

Players out

Loans in

Loans out

See also 
 List of Aberdeen F.C. seasons

Footnotes

References 

2021-22
Scottish football clubs 2021–22 season
2021–22 UEFA Europa Conference League participants seasons